Igor Čimbur (born 23 June 1989) is a Croatian male badminton player who plays for the Medvedgrad 1998 and also Langenfeld badminton club in Germany. At the Croatian National Badminton Championships, he won the men's doubles title from 2009 to 2012 and in 2017 partnered with Zvonimir Hölbling, and in the mixed doubles in 2009 and 2017 with Matea Čiča. At the International event, he was the runner-up of the 2017 Croatian International tournament partnered with Samatcha Tovannakasem of Thailand.

Achievements

BWF International Challenge/Series
Men's Doubles

 BWF International Challenge tournament
 BWF International Series tournament
 BWF Future Series tournament

References

External links
 

1989 births
Living people
Croatian male badminton players